The toothed miner bee (Andrena mandibularis) is a species of miner bee in the family Andrenidae. It is found in Central America and North America.

References

Further reading

 
 

mandibularis